The philosophy of testimony (also, epistemology of testimony) considers the nature of language and knowledge's confluence, which occurs when beliefs are transferred between speakers and hearers through testimony. Testimony constitutes words, gestures, or utterances that convey beliefs. This definition may be distinguished from the legal notion of testimony in that the speaker does not have to make a declaration of the truth of the facts.

The role of testimony in acquiring belief and knowledge has been a relatively neglected philosophical issue. CAJ (Tony) Coady believes that this is because traditional epistemology has had a distinctly individualist flavour.

However, it seems that many of the beliefs that we hold have been gained through accepting testimony. For example, one may only know that Kent is a county of England or that David Beckham earns $30 million per year because one has learned these things from other people. A more striking example is the belief about one's own birthdate. If you know your birthdate, the evidence for your belief was almost certainly received through testimony.

One of the problems with acquiring knowledge through testimony is that it does not seem to live up to the standards of knowledge (see justification of knowledge in philosophy ). As Owens notes, it does not seem to live up to the Enlightenment ideal of rationality captured in the motto of the Royal Society – ‘Nullius in verba (no man's word)’. Crudely put, the question is: 'How can testimony give us knowledge when we have no reasons of our own?'

Coady suggests that there are two approaches to this problem:
Reductivism, which seeks to ‘reduce’ or re-describe our behaviour such that it is not at odds with the traditional view of knowledge
and
Anti-reductivism, which seeks to fit our behaviour in with a different concept of knowledge. For example, we may compare it to an account of how perception gives us knowledge or how memory gives us knowledge directly.

Hume is one of the few early philosophers to offer anything like a sustained account of testimony, this can be found in his ‘An Enquiry Concerning Human Understanding’ in the section on miracles. The basic idea is that our justification for believing what people tell us comes from our experience of the ‘...constant and regular conjunction’ between the state of affairs as people describe it and the actual state of affairs (i.e. our observation that they match). On Coady's schema he is a reductivist.

Coady offers an anti-reductivist account of testimony. He claims that testimony is like perception, we don't have to have reasons for believing it, only an absence of reasons not to believe it. On Coady's account we are justified in being credulous. Proponents of anti-reductivism in the history of philosophy include Augustine of Hippo and Thomas Reid.

Perhaps also significant is that Bertrand Russell argued that knowledge by acquaintance played an important part in epistemology.

Locke on Testimony
This article needs reference to two recent papers:
- Joseph Shieber, 'Locke on Testimony: A Reexamination' History of Philosophy Quarterly, Vol. 26, No. 1 (Jan., 2009), pp. 21-41
- Mark Boespflug (2019): Locke on testimony, British Journal for the History of
Philosophy, DOI: 10.1080/09608788.2019.1566692

The abstract of the second runs as follows: "There is good reason to regard John Locke’s treatment of testimony as perhaps the most important of the early modern period. It is sophisticated, well developed, pioneering, and seems to have given shape to the later debate that would occur between Hume and Reid. I attempt to do three things in this essay. First, I argue that Hume’s landmark treatment of testimony is an
appropriation of that developed by Locke. Second, I suggest that understanding Locke’s view of testimony is of critical importance to Locke’s
broader epistemology. Finally, I claim that Locke’s reflection on testimony is valuable in its own right in that it is not confined to isolating the conditions under which testimonial beliefs are warranted or justified. Locke’s interest is, rather, in a variety of doxastic states, or degrees of assent, that testimony may serve to ground"

Notes

References
 Coady, C.A.J. (1992), ‘Testimony; A Philosophical Study’, Clarendon Press, Oxford. 
 Gelfert, A. (2014), ‘A Critical Introduction to Testimony’, Bloomsbury Academic, London. 
 Owens, D. (2000), ‘Reason without Freedom: The Problem of Epistemic Normativity’, Routledge, London. 
 Shieber, J. (2015), "Testimony: A Philosophical Introduction", Routledge, London. 
 Hume, D. (1748), ‘An Enquiry Concerning Human Understanding’, Hackett Publishing Company, Cambridge.

Further reading 
 
 Jonathan Adler, Epistemological problems of testimony (Stanford Encyclopedia of Philosophy)
 Paul Faulkner, "On the Rationality of Our Response to testimony", Synthese 131 (2002) 353-70.
 Elizabeth Fricker, "The Epistemology of Testimony", Proceedings of the Aristotelian Society, Suppl. vol. 61 (1987) 57-83.
 Axel Gelfert, "Kant on Testimony", British Journal for the History of Philosophy 14 (2006) 627-652.
 Peter J. Graham,  "Transferring Knowledge", Nous 34 (2000) 131-152.
 Peter King and Nathan Ballantyne, "Augustine on Testimony", Canadian Journal of Philosophy 39 (2009) 195-214.
 Martin Kusch, "Testimony in Communitarian Epistemology", Studies in History and Philosophy of Science 33A (2002) 353-354.
 Peter Lipton, "The Epistemology of Testimony", Studies in the History and Philosophy of Science 29 (1998) 1-31.
 Bimal Krishna Matilal, Arindam Chakrabarti (eds.), Knowing From Words, Dordrecht: Kluwer 1994.
 Duncan Pritchard, "The Epistemology of Testimony", Philosophical Issues 14 (2004) 326-348.
 Angus Ross, "Why Do We Believe What We Are Told?", Ratio 28 (1986) 69-88.
 Joseph Shieber, "Locke on Testimony: A Reexamination", History of Philosophy Quarterly 26 (2009) 21-41.
 Tomoji Shogenji, "A Defense of Reductionism about Testimonial Justification of Beliefs", Nous 40 (2006) 331-346.

Epistemology